Please don't delete this article because this actor or actress will play a lead or supporting role in the tokusatsu series "Uchu Sentai Kyuranger"  and will continue their career and make more roles, either lead or supporting, after the end of the programme.

 is a Japanese singer, actor and fashion model. He is represented with Yoshimoto Creative Agency. He graduated from Kyoto University of Foreign Studies. He is a member of the idol group Yoshimotozaka46.

On July 12, 2020, it was announced that Sakakibara had tested positive for COVID-19 and he had recovered from it 6 days later.

Filmography

TV drama

Films

Stage

References

External links
 

Japanese male pop singers
Japanese male actors
Musicians from Aichi Prefecture
1989 births
Living people

21st-century Japanese singers
21st-century Japanese male singers
Yoshimotozaka46 members